Caspar Klein (born 28 August 1865 in Elben; died 25 January 1941) was a Catholic Archbishop of Paderborn, Germany, during the Nazi era.

As Archbishop of Paderborn in the 1930s, Klein protested the anti-Christian propaganda put out by the Nazis. Documents prepared by the American OSS, and used in evidence at the Nuremberg Trials, record that the Nazis were cautious with regard to the murder of church leaders, and conscious of not wanting to create martyrs. Nevertheless, Catholic leaders frequently faced violence or the threat of violence, particularly at the hands of the SA, the SS or Hitler Youth. A number of cases were cited by the OSS, including one against Archbishop Klein of Paderborn.

See also

Nazi persecution of the Catholic Church
Catholic resistance to Nazism

References

1865 births
1941 deaths
Roman Catholic bishops of Paderborn
20th-century German Roman Catholic bishops
Roman Catholics in the German Resistance
20th-century German Roman Catholic priests